Mănăștur is a district of the Romanian city of Cluj-Napoca, which has been a part of the city since 1895.

Its population as of 2007 was of approximately 126,600.

History

Middle Ages
Mănăștur is home to the Calvaria Church, a Benedictine abbey built in the 9th-10th centuries.

20th century
After the German-Italian arbitrated 1940 Second Vienna Award, Kolozsmonostor (Mănăștur) was situated 1 km from the border with Romania, at Erdőfelek/Feleacu.

The district was changed  during Nicolae Ceaușescu's systematisation urban reconstruction program, when many blocks of flats were built, which housed a mainly working class population.

See also
Grădinile Mănăștur, a nearby district

References

Districts of Cluj-Napoca